The tenga was the currency of Bukhara until 1920. It was subdivided into 10 falus. It was replaced by the Russian ruble at a rate of 1 ruble = 5 tenga.

The name of the tenga is derived from the Sanskrit word tanka. All inscriptions on Bukharan tenga are written in Persian, and from 1787 verses from the Qur'an no longer appear on Bukharan coins. Tenga coins generally weigh 3.2 grams.

References

Currencies of Asia
Modern obsolete currencies
Emirate of Bukhara
1920 disestablishments